How You Live is the twelfth album and seventh studio album from contemporary Christian music group Point of Grace. It was released on August 28, 2007 and has achieved critical and commercial success, peaking at #56 on the Billboard 200 and at #4 on the Billboard Christian & Gospel Album Charts.

The success of the single "How You Live (Turn Up The Music)" earned the group the Dove Award for Country Recorded Song of the Year. The song's writer, Cindy Morgan, was awarded the Songwriter of the Year award, and the girls were nominated for four more awards. At the performance of the song on the live telecast, the girls were accompanied by Morgan on the piano, and their own Denise Jones on guitar.

This was also the group's last album as a quartet, as Heather Payne announced her retirement in June 2008, after in late 2007 she had given birth to her fourth child, a daughter, Ava.

Due to Payne's departure and the group's increasing popularity within the country music market, Warner Music Group commissioned a re-release of the album, labeled "deluxe edition." This edition added two new songs and an acoustic version of the title track.

Track listing

Personnel 

Point of Grace
 Shelley Breen – lead vocals (2, 6, 7, 8, 10, 11), backing vocals 
 Leigh Cappillino – lead vocals (2, 5, 6, 8, 9, 11), backing vocals 
 Denise Jones – lead vocals (2, 4, 6, 7, 8, 11), backing vocals 
 Heather Payne – lead vocals (1, 2, 3, 5, 6, 8, 11), backing vocals 

Musicians
 Blair Masters – keyboards (1-11)
 John Hobbs – acoustic piano (1-11)
 Bryan Sutton – acoustic guitar (1-11), banjo (1-11), mandolin (1, 2, 10)
 Tom Bukovac – electric guitar (1-11)
 Jerry McPherson – electric guitar (1, 2, 5, 7)
 George Cocchini – electric guitar (5)
 Paul Franklin – steel guitar (3, 4, 6-9, 11)
 Matt Pierson – bass (1-11)
 Shannon Forrest – drums (1-11)
 Stuart Duncan – fiddle (4, 8, 11)
 Carl Marsh – orchestral arrangements (3, 9)
 James Fitzpatrick – contractor (3, 9)
 City of Prague Philharmonic Orchestra – orchestra (3, 9)

Production 
 Brown Bannister – producer 
 Michael Blanton – executive producer 
 Conor Farley – A&R 
 Tim Marshall – A&R
 Cheryl McTyre – A&R
 Steve Bishir – recording, mixing (2, 3, 5, 7)
 David Zaffiro – mixing (1, 8-10, 12)
 Gary Paczosa – mixing (4, 6, 11)
 Brandon Bell – mix assistant 
 Aaron Sternke – digital editing 
 Bill Whittington – digital editing
 Adam Ayan – mastering 
 Traci Sterling Bishir – production coordinator 
 Katherine Petillo – creative director 
 Jeremy Cowart – photography 
 David Kaufman – wardrobe 

Studios
 Recorded at The Tracking Room, Oxford Sound and Townsend Sound Studios (Nashville, Tennessee).
 Mixed at Seventeen Grand Recording (Nashville, Tennessee); The Puget Sound (Spring Hill, Tennessee); Apollo Sound Productions (Clearwater, Florida).
 Mastered at Gateway Mastering (Portland, Maine).

Singles
 "All The World"
 "You Are Good"
 "How You Live (Turn Up The Music)"
 "Fearless Heart"
 "Heal The Wound"
 "I Wish"
 "King of the World"

Music videos
 "How You Live" (Erwin Brothers, directors)
 "I Wish" (Erwin Brothers, directors)

Awards

In 2008, the album won a Dove Award for Rock Album of the Year at the 39th GMA Dove Awards. The song "How You Live (Turn Up the Music)" won the award for Country Recorded Song of the Year.

References

2007 albums
Point of Grace albums
Albums produced by Brown Bannister